Cristián Eduardo Reynero Cerda (born August 25, 1979 in Chile) is a Chilean footballer, who currently plays defender for Barnechea.

Career
He started his career with Huachipato, where he played from 1999 to 2006.  In the last four seasons with the club, Reynero served as team captain.  In 2007, he was signed by Audax Italiano. He has played over 300 games in the Primera División de Chile.

External links
 
 
 

1979 births
Living people
Chilean footballers
Chile international footballers
C.D. Antofagasta footballers
Curicó Unido footballers
C.D. Huachipato footballers
Audax Italiano footballers
Ñublense footballers
Chilean Primera División players
Primera B de Chile players
Footballers from Santiago
Association football defenders